Francisco Tenório Júnior (born July 4, 1941 in Río de Janeiro - disappeared and presumed dead in March, 1976) was a Brazilian musician and composer. Despite recording only one album as a solo artist, he was considered one of the best pianists of his generation, and his fame as a virtuoso creator has increased over the years.

He went missing in mysterious circumstances in Argentina during the first year of that country's last civil-military dictatorship: in March 1976, while on tour at Buenos Aires with Toquinho and Vinícius de Moraes, Tenório Júnior went out one night to buy cigarettes, and he was never seen again; it was quickly surmised that he might have been rounded up by the dictatorship's security forces and kidnapped, being subsequently thrown in jail, tortured and murdered.

Biography 
Born and raised in the neighborhood of Laranjeiras, in Rio de Janeiro, he was considered one of the most important musicians of bossa nova. He used to be presented in the Lane in Rio de Janeiro. Simultaneously with his development as a musician Tenório Júnior was studying medicine at the National School of Medicine, and quickly became in the 1970s one of the Brazilian professionals most sought after by artists. He used to perform at Beco das Garrafas (Alley of the Bottles), a place in Copacabana famous for being one of the redoubts in which bossa nova emerged.

His piano can be heard on anthological albums of Brazilian music such as Arte Maior (1963) by Leny Andrade (with the "Tenório Jr. Trio"), É Samba Novo (1964) by Edson Machado, O LP(1964) by Os Cobras, Vagamente (1964) by Wanda Sá and Desenhos (1966) by Vitor Assis Brasil.

In 1976, after a show in Buenos Aires, in which he accompanied with a great performance the famous musicians Vinicius de Moraes and Toquinho, Tenório Júnior disappeared without a trace. At first, it was not known whether he was in any prison or if he died in Argentina. 
At the time several versions ran, as quoted by singer Elis Regina in an interview to Folha de S.Paulo on 3 June 1979, that he had been seen in jail in La Plata City; this was never confirmed.
Ten years after his disappearance, Claudio Vallejos, a former corporal and member of the Naval Information Service, the Secret Service of the Argentine Navy, revealed to the defunct magazine Senhor (n° 270, May 1986), that Tenório Júnior had been approached on the street by a military patrol and arrested. According to Vallejos, Brazilian authorities had been informed of the kidnapping and death of Tenório Júnior. Vallejos said Tenório Júnior was imprisoned in the ESMA (Navy Mechanics School); a notorious clandestine center and apparatus of repression of the Argentine Navy that existed between 1976 and 1979 and, according to reports and complaints, was the scene of almost five thousand murders.

In the book Operación Condor: Pacto Criminal (Operation Condor: Criminal Pact), launched in Mexico in 2001, the journalist Stella Calloni says Tenório Júnior was tortured by Brazilian and Argentine officials, including a Brazilian Army major Souza Vieira Baptista. The story of Calloni converges with the interview Claudio Vallejos published in the magazine Senhor, in which the former Argentine military claimed that Brazilian agents had been present during the execution of Tenório Júnior, which occurred nine days after his arrest. The executor could have been the infamous Alfredo Astiz, a frigate former captain of the Argentine Navy also implicated in the murder and forced disappearance of dozens of people and sentenced to life imprisonment in 2011 for Crimes against humanity, carried on by Astiz during Argentina's last military dictatorship.

Francisco Tenório Júnior was 34 years old. He left four children and his wife, Carmen Cerqueira Magalhaes, who was pregnant at the time of his disappearance. His fifth child was born one month after his disappearance. 

The National Commission on the Disappearance of Persons (CONADEP), an Argentine organization created by President Raúl Alfonsín on 15 December 1983 (shortly after the return of democracy) to investigate the fate of the desaparecidos (victims of forced disappearance) and other human rights violations during the military dictatorship confirmed in its famous document Nunca Más (Never Again) - which details the research of the investigation commission with a complete summary and was published as an official report in Spanish; delivered to Alfonsín on 20 September 1984 - that Tenório Júnior's death took place in March 1976 in Buenos Aires.

Soon after the disappearance of Tenório Júnior, the Brazilian filmmaker Rogerio Lima produced the 16mm short film Balada para Tenório (A ballad for Tenório), which chronicled the disappearance of Tenório Júnior and interviews his family and friends.

In 1986, when former Argentinian corporal Claudio Vallejos came to Brazil and gave a revealing interview to Senhor, the production house VIDECOM of São Paulo, along with Rogério Lima, managed to record his testimony, which was used as the basis for a documentary about Tenório Júnior, which chronicles the tragedy that befell on the musician. Vallejos was arrested as determined by the then Minister of Justice, Paulo Brossard, days after the publication of the interview. In August 1987, in a new interview with Senhor, the former agent said he suffered during his brief imprisonment, threats of men in federal police and received the recommendation not to insist on references to the omission of the Brazilian embassy and the involvement of Brazilian agents in the death of Tenório Júnior. 

The documentary had its premiere at the 1986 Film and Video Festival of Rio de Janeiro, one day before the premiere Claudio Vallejos was expelled from Brazil, after three months in prison, without having been subjected to a process. 
In the video, the lawyer Luis Eduardo Greenhalgh stated he believes that Tenório Júnior died in prison and that he had been arrested by mistake, "He was in the wrong place at the wrong time carrying an ID from the Musicians Union". 
According to people close to the pianist, Tenório Júnior, although being the son of a police chief, had never expressed political and ideological preferences. In an interview in 2003, Toquinho said that Tenório Júnior physical appearance may have contributed to his arrest: "Tenorio was of a unique kind, very tall, with beard, long hair, wore a long cloak, was mistaken for someone else".

In 1996, the VIDECOM documentary was updated with unpublished archive images, reedited and presented by the public TV network TV Cultura of São Paulo.

The Spanish filmmaker Fernando Trueba has plans to carry out a documentary or feature film about the disappearance of the Brazilian pianist and recorded some interviews in Brazil with Rogerio Silva some relatives of Tenório Júnior and the VIDECOM crew.

Claudio Vallejos returned to Brazil (supposedly around 2002) and settled in the region Chapecó in Santa Catarina. He was arrested in 2010 for embezzlement and forgery. Released some time later, he was again arrested for larceny in January 2012. His arrest had been requested to Interpol by the Argentine federal prosecutor who handles the criminal proceedings linked to Operation Condor, the military-political alliance between the dictatorships of Argentina, Brazil, Chile and Uruguay in the 1970s and 1980s, which was sponsored by the United States government. When the identity of Vallejos was confirmed, the prosecutor petitioned the Brazilian government for his extradition to Argentina. On 27 March 2013, Vallejos was delivered by Federal Police to Argentine police at the airport in Florianópolis.

Discography

As leader
 Embalo (1964)

As accompanist
 ...E Samba Novo (1963), accompanying Edison Machado
 O LP (1964), with Os Cobras
 Vagamente (1964), accompanying Wanda Sá
 Doris Monteiro (1964), accompanying Doris Monteiro
 India (1973), accompanying Gal Costa
 Beto Guedes - Danilo Caymmi - Novelli - Toninho Horta (1973), accompanying the eponymous musicians
 Missa Breve (1973), accompanying Edu Lobo
 Egberto Gismonti (1973), accompanying Egberto Gismonti
 Academia de Danças (1974), accompanying Egberto Gismonti
 Nós (1974), accompanying Johnny Alf
 Bossa Nova nos "States" (1962), accompanying Juarez Araújo
 A Arte Maior de Leny Andrade (1964), accompanying Leny Andrade
 Minas (1975), accompanying Milton Nascimento
 Nana Caymmi (1975),  accompanying Nana Caymmi
 Samba Nova Concepção (1964), (Various Artists)
 Desenhos (1966), accompanying Victor Assis Brasil

References

External links
 

1970s missing person cases
1976 deaths
1941 births
20th-century pianists
Brazilian jazz pianists
Bossa nova pianists
Enforced disappearances in Brazil
Dead and missing in the fight against the military dictatorship in Brazil (1964–1985)